Lists of amphibians by region are lists of amphibians in a given continent, country or smaller region.

Africa

Democratic Republic of the Congo
Ghana
Guinea-Bissau
Ivory Coast
Daloa
Madagascar
Seychelles

Asia

Bhutan
China
Hong Kong
India
Northeast India
Sikkim
Indonesia
Java
Sumatra
Korea
Malaysia
Nepal
Pakistan
Philippines
Cebu
Panay
Singapore
Taiwan
Thailand
Vietnam
Hoàng Liên National Park

Australasia

Australia
South Australia
Western Australia
Tasmania
New Zealand

Europe

Europe
Bulgaria
Cyprus
France
Gibraltar
Great Britain
Ireland
Italy
Norway
Sweden

North America

North America north of Mexico
Canada
Mexico
United States

States of the United States

Alabama
California
Colorado
Idaho
Indiana
Indiana Dunes
Iowa
Massachusetts
Michigan
Minnesota
Montana
New Mexico
New Jersey
North Carolina
Texas
Virginia
Shenandoah National Park
Washington
West Virginia
Wyoming
Yellowstone National Park

Caribbean

Anguilla
Antigua and Barbuda
Barbados
Cuba
Dominica
Dominican Republic
Grenadines
Guadeloupe
Haiti
Martinique
Montserrat
Puerto Rico
Saba
Saint Barthélemy
Saint Kitts and Nevis
Saint Lucia
Saint Martin
Saint Vincent
Sint Eustatius

Central America

Belize
Costa Rica
El Salvador
Guatemala
Honduras
Nicaragua
Panama

South America

Brazil
Uruguay

See also
 List of amphibians for lists organized by biological class, order and suborder

References 

Region
Amphibians